Güzeldere can refer to:

 Güzeldere, Gölyaka
 Güzeldere, Hınıs